Prince Alexander Sergeevich Obolensky KStJ (17 February 1916 – 29 March 1940) was a Rurikid prince of Russian origin who became a naturalised Briton, having spent most of his life in England, and who went on to represent England in international rugby union.  He was, and remains, popularly known as "The Flying Prince", "The Flying Slav", or simply as "Obo" to many sports fans.

Biography
A member of the Rurik dynasty, he was born at Petrograd (now Saint Petersburg) on 17 February 1916, the son of Prince Sergei Alexandrovich Obolensky, an officer in the Tsar's Imperial Horse Guards and his wife Princess Lubov' (née Naryshkina). The family name derives from the ancient Russian city of Obolensk; they fled Russia after the Bolshevik Revolution of 1917 and settled in Muswell Hill, London. He was appointed a Knight of St John in 1938.

Obolensky was educated at The Ashe boys' preparatory school, Etwall and Trent College, Long Eaton, both in Derbyshire, before going up to Brasenose College, Oxford in Michaelmas 1934, where he held a college exhibition and read Politics, Philosophy and Economics; he graduated with a Fourth Class degree (BA (Oxon)) in 1938.

At Oxford he won two rugby blues representing Oxford University RFC as a wing/three-quarter. Having previously played for Chesterfield FC whilst still at school, he played for Leicester Tigers between 1934 and 1939, as well as Rosslyn Park FC; his selection for England caused a stir because he was not a British subject, although he was naturalised British in March 1936.

On 4 January 1936. Obolensky scored two tries on his England debut in a 13–0 victory over the All Blacks, the first time England had beaten New Zealand. Aided by Pathé News footage of the game, his name has entered into legend, since the first try, beating several All Blacks in a run of three-quarters of the length of the field, was widely regarded as the greatest try of the time, and one of the greatest tries ever scored by England.

Prince Obolensky won three England caps later that year (against Wales on 18 January, Ireland on 8 February and Scotland on 21 March), but scored no further tries. He was selected as a member of the touring party for the 1936 British Lions tour to Argentina. He also played seven games for the "invitation only" Barbarian F.C. between 1937 and 1939, scoring three tries.

On 12 August 1939, Obolensky was commissioned as an Acting Pilot Officer in 615 Squadron (Royal Auxiliary Air Force (RAuxAF)), being stationed at RAF Kenley and at the outbreak of the Second World War in 1939, he joined RAF 504 Squadron.

Death
On 29 March 1940, a day after being recalled to the England squad to play Wales, Pilot Officer Obolensky was killed during training when his Hawker Hurricane Mark 1 overshot the runway at Martlesham Heath Airfield, Suffolk. His aircraft, reference number L1946, dropped into a ravine at the end of the runway during landing, breaking his neck. Aged 24, Obolensky was buried at Ipswich New Cemetery.

Legacy
The "Obolensky Lecture" is given annually on the subject of rugby football, and at Twickenham there is a suite named Obolensky's in his honour.
In February 2008 a project was launched in Ipswich to erect a permanent memorial, resulting in a £50,000 statue being unveiled on 18 February 2009 by his niece, Princess Alexandra Obolensky; the statue by Harry Gray stands on Cromwell Square in the town.
A building is named in his memory at his former school, Trent College.
The "Prince Obolensky Award" is presented annually by the Prince Obolensky Association at Rosslyn Park F.C.
The children's author Gerard Siggins based his fourth 'Rugby Spirit' series novel on Obolensky. In Rugby Flyer his hero, Eoin Madden, meets Obolensky's ghost and learns about his life and death, and recreates one of his famous tries.

See also
List of England rugby union footballers killed in the World Wars
Russian nobility
Twickenham Stadium

References

External links

Obolensky Ipswich
Russian Embassy press release re Ipswich Obolensky Memorial
Alexander Obolensky at Commonwealth War Graves Commission

; Prince Obolensky's two tries are featured first.
Photograph of Obolensky age about 13 at his preparatory school, and article about its discovery
Trent College
The Prince Obolensky Association at Rosslyn Park RFC
England RFU website

1916 births
1940 deaths
Alexander
People educated at Trent College
Alumni of Brasenose College, Oxford
Aviators killed in aviation accidents or incidents in England
Oxford University RFC players
Royal Air Force personnel killed in World War II
England international rugby union players
English rugby union players
Russian rugby union players
Leicester Tigers players
Rosslyn Park F.C. players
Emigrants from the Russian Empire to the United Kingdom
Royal Air Force pilots of World War II
Royal Air Force officers
Knights of the Order of St John
Burials in Suffolk
British & Irish Lions rugby union players from England
Victims of aviation accidents or incidents in 1940